Ayinde Jamiu Lawal (born 12 May 1988) is a Nigerian professional football midfielder who plays for Jutland Series club Skive II, the reserve team of Skive IK.

Career
In February 2021, began playing at amateur level when he joined the reserve team of Skive IK competing in the fifth-tier Jutland Series. He had earlier had different spells at Skive, becoming their first full-time professional in 2009 after he had signed from Midtjylland, and winning Player of the Year award in 2011.

Personal life
After his professional career, Lawal studied to become a social and health care assistant.

References

External links

 
 FC Midtjylland profile
 Career statistics at Danmarks Radio

1988 births
Living people
Association football midfielders
Nigerian footballers
F.C. Ebedei players
FC Midtjylland players
SønderjyskE Fodbold players
Skive IK players
FC Fredericia players
Danish Superliga players
Danish 1st Division players
Nigerian expatriate footballers
Nigerian expatriate sportspeople in Denmark
Expatriate men's footballers in Denmark
Yoruba sportspeople